The 1915–16 Mississippi A&M Aggies basketball team represented Mississippi A&M College in the 1915–16 college basketball season.

References

Mississippi AandM
Mississippi State Bulldogs men's basketball seasons